Carron Bridge is the name given to two bridges in Scotland:
 The Carron Bridge (River Spey) crosses the Spey near Carron in Moray
 The Carron Bridge (River Carron) crosses the Carron between Stirling and Kilsyth